Qizha (Arabic قزحة qizḥaẗ, pronounced ʼɛzḥa in Palestine) is a black seed paste used in Palestinian cuisine. Made from crushed nigella seeds, the paste has a sharp, bitter taste with slight tones of sweetness. The paste can be used with other condiments, such as tahini, or baked into pies, breads, and pastries.

Production 

Qizha is made from the seeds of Nigella sativa of the buttercup family of plants, which is native to the Middle East and India. The seeds, sometimes known as "black cumin", are soaked in salt water for a night, oven roasted, left on rocks to dry in the sun, and finally ground to make a paste.

Some sources consider the cities of Nablus and Jenin to be the source of the best-quality qizha.

References 

Palestinian cuisine
Food paste
Condiments
Palestinian inventions